Marshall County is a county of the state of Alabama, United States. As of the 2020 census the population was 97,612. Its county seat is Guntersville. A second courthouse is in Albertville. Its name is in honor of John Marshall, famous Chief Justice of the United States. Marshall County is a dry county, with the exception of the four cities of Albertville, Arab, Guntersville, and Boaz. Marshall County comprises the Albertville, AL Micropolitan Statistical Area, which is also included in the Huntsville-Decatur-Albertville, AL Combined Statistical Area.

History
Marshall County was established on January 9, 1836.

Geography
The Tennessee River runs both north and south within the county.

River
Tennessee River

Adjacent counties
Jackson County - northeast
DeKalb County - east
Etowah County - southeast
Blount County - south
Cullman County - southwest
Morgan County - west
Madison County - northwest

Transportation

Major highways

  U.S. Highway 231
  U.S. Highway 431
  State Route 68
  State Route 69
  State Route 75
  State Route 79
  State Route 168
  State Route 179
  State Route 205
  State Route 227

Rail
 Alabama and Tennessee River Railway

Demographics

2000 census
At the 2000 census there were 82,231 people, 32,547 households, and 23,531 families living in the county. There were 36,331 housing units at an average density of 64 per square mile (25/km2). The racial makeup of the county was 93.38% White, 1.47% Black or African American, 0.53% Native American, 0.24% Asian, 0.04% Pacific Islander, 3.24% from other races, and 1.09% from two or more races. 5.66% of the population were Hispanic or Latino of any race.
According to the census of 2000, the largest ancestry groups in Marshall County were English 68.2%, Scots-Irish 12.31%, Scottish 5.1%, Irish 4.22%, Welsh 2.3% and African 1.47%.

Of the 32,547 households 32.40% had children under the age of 18 living with them, 57.80% were married couples living together, 10.70% had a female householder with no husband present, and 27.70% were non-families. 24.60% of households were one person and 10.90% were one person aged 65 or older. The average household size was 2.50 and the average family size was 2.96.

The age distribution was 24.90% under the age of 18, 8.50% from 18 to 24, 29.00% from 25 to 44, 23.40% from 45 to 64, and 14.20% 65 or older. The median age was 37 years. For every 100 females, there were 94.80 males. For every 100 females age 18 and over, there were 91.50 males.

The median household income was $32,167 and the median family income  was $38,788. Males had a median income of $30,500 versus $20,807 for females. The per capita income for the county was $17,089. About 11.70% of families and 14.70% of the population were below the poverty line, including 17.90% of those under age 18 and 19.30% of those age 65 or over.

2010 census
At the 2010 census there were 93,019 people, 35,810 households, and 25,328 families living in the county. There were 40,342 housing units at an average density of 71 per square mile (28/km2). The racial makeup of the county was 87.6% White, 1.6% Black or African American, 0.8% Native American, 0.5% Asian, 0.1% Pacific Islander, 7.8% from other races, and 1.7% from two or more races. 12.1% of the population were Hispanic or Latino of any race.
Of the 35,810 households 30.3% had children under the age of 18 living with them, 53.4% were married couples living together, 12.1% had a female householder with no husband present, and 29.3% were non-families. 25.4% of households were one person and 11.4% were one person aged 65 or older.  The average household size was 2.57 and the average family size was 3.05.

The age distribution was 25.0% under the age of 18, 8.58% from 18 to 24, 25.3% from 25 to 44, 26.0% from 45 to 64, and 14.9% 65 or older. The median age was 38.2 years. For every 100 females, there were 97.2 males.  For every 100 females age 18 and over, there were 100.1 males.

The median household income was $37,661 and the median family income was $47,440. Males had a median income of $36,024 versus $27,478 for females. The per capita income for the county was $19,875. About 15.3% of families and 19.9% of the population were below the poverty line, including 30.3% of those under age 18 and 12.5% of those age 65 or over.

2020 census

As of the 2020 United States census, there were 97,612 people, 35,330 households, and 25,078 families residing in the county.

Religion
At the 2010 census:
 Southern Baptist Convention (35556)
 Catholic Church (8382)
 The United Methodist Church (6908)
 Church of God (Cleveland) (2810)
 Churches of Christ (2495)
 Assemblies of God (692)
 Episcopal Church (669)
 The Church of Jesus Christ of Latter-day Saints (609)

Government

Communities

Cities
 Albertville
 Arab (partly in Cullman County)
 Boaz (partly in Etowah County)
 Guntersville (county seat)

Towns
 Cherokee Ridge
 Douglas
 Grant
 Union Grove

Census-designated place
 Joppa (partly in Cullman County)

Unincorporated communities

 Asbury
 Bucksnort
 Claysville
 Cottonville
 Eddy
 Egypt
 Grassy
 Hog Jaw
 Horton
 Hustleville
 Kennamer Cove
 Little New York
 Morgan City (partly in Morgan County)
 Mount Hebron
 Pinedale Shores
 Rayburn
 Red Hill
 Ruth
 Scant City
 Swearengin
 Warrenton

Ghost town
 Red Apple

Places of interest
Marshall County is home to numerous outdoor recreation areas including Lake Guntersville State Park, Cathedral Caverns State Park, and Buck's Pocket State Park.

See also
 National Register of Historic Places listings in Marshall County, Alabama
 Properties on the Alabama Register of Landmarks and Heritage in Marshall County, Alabama

References

External links
 Marshall County Economic Development Council
 Marshall County Convention & Visitors Bureau
 On the Media show of "JULY 3, 2020 The Worst Thing We've Ever Done" "This episode originally aired on June 1st, 2018. It was re-broadcast on July 3rd, 2020. Start at time 49:00 to end about Marshall County history"

 

 
1836 establishments in Alabama
Populated places established in 1836
Counties of Appalachia
Micropolitan areas of Alabama